Ramapura may refer to places in India:

 Ramapura, Chamarajanagar, Karnataka
 Ramapura, Gauribidanur, Karnataka

See also 
 Ramapuram